Khoro is the name of several rural localities in the Sakha Republic, Russia:
Khoro, Suntarsky District, Sakha Republic, a selo in Khorinsky Rural Okrug of Suntarsky District
Khoro, Verkhnevilyuysky District, Sakha Republic, a selo in Khorinsky Rural Okrug of Verkhnevilyuysky District